Sappinia amoebic encephalitis (SAE) is the name for amoebic encephalitis caused by species of Sappinia.

The causative organism was originally identified as Sappinia diploidea, but is now considered to be Sappinia pedata.
It has been treated with azithromycin, pentamidine, itraconazole, and flucytosine.

References

Encephalitis
Protozoal diseases